Sulphur Springs is a neighborhood and district located within the city limits of Tampa, Florida. As of the 2000 census, the neighborhood had a population of 6,308. In the late 19th century the mineral springs were a draw. In the 1940s the area was a major tourist attraction and home to a 40-foot water slide and gator farm. It is home to Sulphur Springs History and Heritage Museum.

Description 
The neighborhood is well known for the Sulphur Springs Water Tower, built in 1927. The community was annexed into Tampa in 1953. The neighborhood was once known for being a mineral springs tourist attraction for the middle and working classes.

A well-known landmark was the Sulphur Springs Hotel and Arcade, considered to be the first indoor shopping venue in the state of Florida.  It was located at the intersection of Nebraska Avenue and Bird Street on the southwest corner encompassing an entire city block.  Constructed from 1926 to 1927, the hotel was situated near the Hillsborough River and represents an excellent example of a resort recreation facility of early 20th century. The most distinguishing feature of the hotel was its first and second floor front arcade in classical style. Josiah T. Richardson was the original owner of the property.

In 1951 a drive-in theatre opened next to the Sulphur Springs Water Tower. The Tower Theatre was a popular drive-in that operated for nearly forty years and became another well-known Tampa landmark on property facing the Hillsborough River between Florida and Nebraska Avenue.  The neon sign for the drive-in became another Tampa landmark and featured a “neon tower” that was designed after its nearby namesake.

Geography
Sulphur Springs is located at  (28.02500, -82.45111), or about five miles north of downtown Tampa. The community has an elevation of 16 feet above sea level. Sulphur Springs boundaries include Rowlett Park to the east, Florida Avenue to the west, Busch Blvd. to the north, and the Hillsborough River to the south

Demographics 
As of the census of 2010, there were 5,727 people living in the neighborhood. The racial makeup of the neighborhood was 31.1% White, 62.2% Black, 0.4% Native American, 0.5% Asian, 2.4% other races, and 3.4% from two or more races. Hispanic or Latino of any race were 18.6% of the population.

See also

Neighborhoods in Tampa, Florida

References

External links
Sulphur Springs Community Profile
Sulphur Springs demographic profile from The Planning Commission
Sulphur Springs - Ghost Town
Sulphur Springs Oral History Project at the University of South Florida

Neighborhoods in Tampa, Florida
Former census-designated places in Florida